Muchu Chhish  is a mountain in the Batura Muztagh sub-range of the Karakoram in Hunza Valley, a disputed region administrated by Pakistan. Located in a very remote and inaccessible region, only a handful of attempts have been made to reach the summit, none successful. Muchu Chhish is one of the tallest mountains on Earth that remain unclimbed and is the tallest one of all that is not off limits due to religious or political prohibitions. The Batura Glacier, one of the longest outside the polar regions, flanks Muchu Chhish to the north.

Muchu Chhish lacks any well-defined northern or southern ridges of its own; most expeditions thus attempt it via the South Ridge of nearby Batura VI. This ridge was climbed by a Polish expedition in 1983 using fixed ropes while making the first ascent of Batura V and VI, which are immediately west of Muchu Chhish. One attempt was by a Spanish expedition in 1999, which reached  on the south ridge. In 2020, a three-member Czech expedition, including climber Pavel Kořínek and former politician Pavel Bém, made an attempt, but they did not reach the top due to bad weather. The same climbers tried again in 2021, but that attempt failed due to excessive amounts of snow on the ridge.

See also
 Mountains of Pakistan
 Highest unclimbed mountain

References

Mountains of Pakistan